Eucalyptus baileyana, commonly known as Bailey's stringybark, is a tree endemic to near-coastal areas of eastern Australia. It has rough, stringy bark on its trunk and main branches, lance-shaped adult leaves, flower buds in groups of seven, white flowers with stamens in four bundles and urn-shaped to more or less spherical fruit.

Description
It has persistent, red-brown or brown-black, stringy or fibrous bark. The leaves are dark green on one side and a lighter green on the other. Flowering mainly occurs from October to January and the flowers are white with the stamens arranged in four bundles.

Taxonomy and naming
Eucalyptus baileyana was first formally described in 1878 by Ferdinand von Mueller and the description was published in Fragmenta Phytographiae Australiae. The species name (baileyana) honours Frederick Manson Bailey who collected the type specimen from near Moreton Bay.

Distribution
Bailey's stringybark is often found on hills, ridges and coastal lowlands as part of dry sclerophyll forest or woodland communities growing in nutrient poor, shallow sandy soils over sandstone. It extends as far north as Brisbane with a sporadic distribution further north to around the Blackdown Tableland. Species commonly associated with the tree include Eucalyptus planchoniana, Eucalyptus cloeziana, Eucalyptus citriodora, Eucalyptus gummifera and Eucalyptus intermedia.

Conservation
This eucalypt is classed as of "least concern" in Queensland under the Queensland Government Nature Conservation Act 1992.

See also

List of Eucalyptus species

References

baileyana
Myrtales of Australia
Flora of New South Wales
Flora of Queensland
Trees of Australia
Taxa named by Ferdinand von Mueller
Plants described in 1878